The Communauté de communes de la Plaine de France is a former federation of municipalities (communauté de communes) in the Plaine de France (also known as the Pays de France) within the Seine-et-Marne département and the Île-de-France région of France. It was created in May 1990. It was merged into the new Communauté de communes Plaines et Monts de France in June 2013.

Composition 
The Communauté de communes comprised the following communes:

Juilly
Mauregard
Le Mesnil-Amelot
Moussy-le-Vieux
Nantouillet
Othis
Rouvres
Vinantes

See also
Communes of the Seine-et-Marne department

References

Former commune communities of Seine-et-Marne